Memoirs is the debut album by British singer Rox.

Track listing

Charts

References

2010 albums